Academy for College and Career Exploration (ACCE) is a public secondary school located in Baltimore, Maryland, United States. The school opened in the city in fall 2004 under the guidance of being an "innovation" school by Johns Hopkins researchers. Another school created with the same guidelines of being a "innovation" school, Baltimore Talent Development also opened around the same time.
ACCE is now converted into a "transformation" middle/high school with grades 6-7/9-12 for the 2011–2012 school year.

References

External links 
 
 Academy for College and Career Exploration - Maryland Report Card
 Johns Hopkins Press Release

Public schools in Baltimore
Public high schools in Maryland
Public middle schools in Maryland
Charter schools in Maryland
Educational institutions established in 2004
2004 establishments in Maryland